The 2022–23 Premier League International Cup is the seventh season of the Premier League International Cup, a European club football competition organised by the Premier League for under-23 players. 

Bayern Munich were the defending champions, after beating Dinamo Zagreb 2–0 in the 2018–19 tournament's final, with the tournaments in 2019–20, 2020–21 and 2021–22 all being cancelled due to the COVID-19 pandemic. Bayern Munich did not take part in this edition, guaranteeing a new champion.

Format
The competition featured twenty-four teams: twelve from English league system and twelve invitees from other European countries. The teams were split into three groups of eight. The group winners, runners-up and two best third-placed teams, progress into the knockout phase of the tournament.

All matches were played in England.

Teams

English league system:
 Arsenal
 Blackburn Rovers
 Brighton & Hove Albion
 Crystal Palace
 Everton
 Fulham
 Leicester City
 Liverpool
 Manchester United
 Stoke City
 West Ham United
 Wolverhampton Wanderers

Other countries:
 Dinamo Zagreb
 Sparta Prague
 Valencia
 Monaco
 Paris Saint-Germain
 Hertha BSC
 VfL Wolfsburg
 Feyenoord
 PSV Eindhoven
 Braga
 Porto
 Celtic

Group stage

Group A

Group B

Group C

Ranking of third-placed teams

Knockout stages

Quarter-finals

Semi-finals

Final

References

2022-23
International Cup
2022–23 in European football
2022–23 in English football